Julio Ojeda Pascual (April 12, 1932 – April 28, 2013) was the Roman Catholic bishop of the Vicariate Apostolic of San Ramón, Peru.

Ordained to the priesthood in 1957, Ojeda Pascual was named bishop in 1987 and resigned in 2003.

Notes

1932 births
2013 deaths
20th-century Roman Catholic bishops in Peru
21st-century Roman Catholic bishops in Peru
Roman Catholic bishops of San Ramón